Lance R. Guest (born July 21, 1960) is an American film and television actor, best known for his starring role in 1984's The Last Starfighter.

Biography

Guest developed a serious interest in acting as a freshman while attending Saratoga High School, and he majored in theater while attending UCLA. He has starred in many theatrical films, including his role as Jimmy alongside actress Jamie Lee Curtis in Halloween II (1981), and also starred in Neil Simon's I Ought to Be in Pictures. His most notable role was in the science fiction film The Last Starfighter (1984) as Alex Rogan, and as Beta, a robot sent to replace Alex while he was in space. He has starred in Jaws: The Revenge (1987) as Michael Brody. Guest played Cosmo Cola in Stepsister from Planet Weird (2000). He played Hugo Archibald in The Jennie Project (2001).  Also that year, he appeared in Mach 2 (2001).

Guest's starring television roles included Lou Grant (1981–1982) and Knots Landing (1991). Guest has guest-starred on St. Elsewhere, The Wonder Years, Party of Five, JAG, NYPD Blue, The X-Files, Becker, Life Goes On, House, and Jericho.

Guest has starred on Broadway as Johnny Cash in the musical Million Dollar Quartet, a fictionalized depiction of the only time Carl Perkins, Jerry Lee Lewis, Johnny Cash, and Elvis Presley ever recorded music as a group.

Filmography

Films

Television

References

External links
 
 

1960 births
Male actors from California
American male film actors
American male musical theatre actors
American male soap opera actors
Living people
UCLA Film School alumni
People from Saratoga, California